Chest pain is pain or discomfort in the chest, typically the front of the chest. It may be described as sharp, dull, pressure, heaviness or squeezing. Associated symptoms may include pain in the shoulder, arm, upper abdomen, or jaw, along with nausea, sweating, or shortness of breath. It can be divided into heart-related and non-heart-related pain. Pain due to insufficient blood flow to the heart is also called angina pectoris. Those with diabetes or the elderly may have less clear symptoms.

Serious and relatively common causes include acute coronary syndrome such as a heart attack (31%), pulmonary embolism (2%), pneumothorax, pericarditis (4%), aortic dissection (1%) and esophageal rupture. Other common causes include gastroesophageal reflux disease (30%), muscle or skeletal pain (28%), pneumonia (2%), shingles (0.5%), pleuritis, traumatic and anxiety disorders. Determining the cause of chest pain is based on a person's medical history, a physical exam and other medical tests. About 3% of heart attacks, however, are initially missed.

Management of chest pain is based on the underlying cause. Initial treatment often includes the medications aspirin and nitroglycerin. The response to treatment does not usually indicate whether the pain is heart-related. When the cause is unclear, the person may be referred for further evaluation.

Chest pain represents about 5% of presenting problems to the emergency room. In the United States, about 8 million people go to the emergency department with chest pain a year. Of these, about 60% are admitted to either the hospital or an observation unit. The cost of emergency visits for chest pain in the United States is more than US$8 billion per year. Chest pain accounts for about 0.5% of visits by children to the emergency department.

Signs and symptoms 
Chest pain may present in different ways depending upon the underlying diagnosis. Chest pain may also vary from person to person based upon age, sex, weight, and other differences. Chest pain may present as a stabbing, burning, aching, sharp, or pressure-like sensation in the chest. Chest pain may also radiate, or move, to several other areas of the body. This may include the neck, left or right arms, cervical spine, back, and upper abdomen. Other associated symptoms with chest pain can include nausea, vomiting, dizziness, shortness of breath, anxiety, and sweating. The type, severity, duration, and associated symptoms of chest pain can help guide diagnosis and further treatment.

Differential diagnosis
Causes of chest pain range from non-serious to serious to life-threatening.

In adults the most common causes of chest pain include: gastrointestinal (42%), coronary artery disease (31%), musculoskeletal (28%), pericarditis (4%) and pulmonary embolism (2%). Other less common causes include: pneumonia, lung cancer, and aortic aneurysms. Psychogenic causes of chest pain can include panic attacks; however, this is a diagnosis of exclusion.

In children, the most common causes for chest pain are musculoskeletal (76-89%), exercise-induced asthma (4-12%), gastrointestinal illness (8%), and psychogenic causes (4%). Chest pain in children can also have congenital causes.

Cardiovascular

 Acute coronary syndrome
 Stable or unstable angina
 Myocardial infarction ("heart attack"): People usually complained of a pressure or squeezing sensation over the chest. Other associated symptoms are: excessive sweating, nausea, vomiting, and weakness. Chest pain is more commonly associated with anterior infarction because of left ventricular impairment; inferior infarction is more commonly associated with nausea, vomiting, and excessive sweating due to irritation of vagus nerve; lateral infarction is associated with left arm pain.
 Prinzmetal's angina: Chest pain is caused by coronary vasospasm. More common in women younger than 50 years. Person usually complain of chest pain at rest. It may occur early in the morning which awaken person from sleep.
 Cocaine use: This condition is suspected when a person with few or no risk of arteriosclerosis presented with non-traumatic chest pain. Ingestion of cocaine can cause vasoconstriction of coronary arteries, thus producing chest pain similar to heart attack. Symptoms can appear within one hour of cocaine use.
 Aortic stenosis: This condition happens when the person has underlying congenital bicuspid valve, aortic sclerosis, or history of rheumatic fever. Chest pain usually happens during physical activity. Syncope is a late symptom. Signs and symptoms of heart failure may also present. On auscultation, loud ejection systolic murmur can be best heard at the right second intercostal space and radiates to the carotid artery in the neck. Splitting of second heart sound is heard in severe stenosis.
 Hypertrophic cardiomyopathy: It is the hypertrophy of interventricular septum that causes outflow obstruction of left ventricle. Dyspnea and chest pain commonly occurs during daily activities. Sometimes, syncope (fainting) may happen. On physical examination, significant findings include: loud systolic murmur and palpable triple apical impulse due to palpable presystolic fourth heart sound.
 Aortic dissection is characterized by severe chest pain that radiates the back. It is usually associated with Marfan's syndrome and hypertension. On examination, murmur of aortic insufficiency can be heard with unequal radial pulses.
 Pericarditis: This condition can be the result of viral infection such as coxsackie virus and echovirus, tuberculosis, autoimmune disease, uremia, and after myocardial infarction (Dressler syndrome). The chest pain is often pleuritic in nature (associated with respiration) which is aggravated when lying down and relieved on sitting forward, sometimes, accompanied by fever. On auscultation, pericardial friction rub can be heard.
 Cardiac tamponade
 Arrhythmia: Atrial fibrillation and a number of other arrhythmias can cause chest pain.
 Myocarditis
 Mitral valve prolapse syndrome: Those affected are usually slim females presented with chest pain which is sharp in quality, localized at the apex, and relieved when lying down. Other symptoms include: shortness of breath, fatigue, and palpitations. On auscultation, midsystolic click followed by late systolic murmur can be heard, louder when person is in standing position.
 Aortic aneurysm

Respiratory
 Asthma is a common long-term inflammatory disease of the airways of the lungs. It is characterized by variable and recurring symptoms, reversible airflow obstruction, and bronchospasm. Symptoms include episodes of wheezing, coughing, chest tightness, and shortness of breath. Chest pain usually happens during a strenuous activity or heavy exercise.
 Bronchitis
 Pulmonary embolism: Common signs and symptoms are shortness of breath, pleuritic chest pain, blood in sputum during cough, and lower limb swelling. Risk factors includes: recent surgery, malignancy, and bedridden state. Source of embolus usually comes from venous thromboembolism.
 Pneumonia
 Hemothorax
 Pneumothorax: Those who are at a higher risk of developing pneumothorax are tall, slim male smokers who have had underlying lung diseases such as emphysema. Those affected can have a sharp chest pain which radiates to the shoulder of the same side. Physical examination revealed absent breath sounds and hyperresonance on the affected side of the chest.
 Pleurisy
 Tuberculosis
 Tracheitis
 Lung cancer

Gastrointestinal

 Gastroesophageal reflux disease: The pain is aggravated when lying down or after meals. Persons may describe this as a heartburn. Besides, they may also complain of tasting bitter contents from the stomach.
 Achalasia, nutcracker esophagus, and other motility disorders of the esophagus
 Diffuse esophageal spasm: Unlike cardiac chest pain, esophageal pain is not related to activity. The pain is usually associated with swallowing of hot or cold water.
 Esophageal rupture: Those affected usually complain of sudden, severe, and constant pain that starts from the neck to the upper abdomen. The pain is aggravated by swallowing. On examination, neck swelling and crepitations can be felt due to subcutaneous emphysema as free air is entering from esophagus into the subcutaneous tissue.
 Esophagitis: There are many causes of esophagitis. Esophagitis caused by Candida albicans is usually found in chemotherapy or HIV patients. Medication such as nonsteroidal anti-inflammatory drug and alendronate can induce esophagitis if not swallowed properly.
 Functional dyspepsia
 Hiatus hernia
 Jackhammer esophagus (hypercontractile peristalsis): Intense long-lasting esophageal muscle spasm.
 Acute cholecystitis: Characterized by positive Murphy's sign where the person has a cessation of inhalation when the doctor places his finger at the right subcostal region of the abdomen.
 Acute pancreatitis: History of excessive alcohol use, cholelithiasis (stones in the gallbladder), and hypertriglyceridemia are risk factors for pancreatitis. It is a constant, boring pain in the upper abdomen.
 Perforated peptic ulcer: Sudden onset of severe pain in the upper abdomen which later develops into peritonitis (inflammation of tissues that lines the abdominal organs).
 Acute gastritis

Chest wall
 Costochondritis or Tietze's syndrome: An inflammation of a costochondral junction. Any movements or palpation of the chest can reproduce the symptoms.
 Spinal nerve problem
 Fibromyalgia
 Chest wall problems
 Radiculopathy
 Precordial catch syndrome: Another benign and harmless form of a sharp, localized chest pain often mistaken for heart disease.
 Breast conditions
 Herpes zoster (shingles): It is usually described as a burning sensation over the chest in a unilateral dermatome distribution. However, diagnosis can be difficult because the pain usually appears before the characteristic rash is visible.
 Tuberculosis
 Osteoarthritis
 Bornholm disease
 Rib fracture

Psychological
 Panic attack: Chest pain is a common symptom of panic attacks, with as high as 78% of persons describing chest pain with their worst panic attacks. Overall chest pain is a symptom of up to 48% of sudden-onset panic attacks, and 10% of gradual-onset panic attacks.
 Anxiety
 Clinical depression
 Somatization disorder
 Hypochondria

Others
 Hyperventilation syndrome often presents with chest pain and a tingling sensation of the fingertips and around the mouth.
 Da costa's syndrome
 Carbon monoxide poisoning
 Sarcoidosis
 Lead poisoning
 Prolapsed intervertebral disc
 Thoracic outlet syndrome
 Adverse effect from certain medications

Diagnostic approach

History taking

Knowing a person's risk factors can be extremely useful in ruling in or ruling out serious causes of chest pain. For example, heart attack and thoracic aortic dissection are very rare in healthy individuals under 30 years of age, but significantly more common in individuals with significant risk factors, such as older age, smoking, hypertension, diabetes, history of coronary artery disease or stroke, positive family history (premature atherosclerosis, cholesterol disorders, heart attack at early age), and other risk factors. Chest pain that radiates to one or both shoulders or arms, chest pain that occurs with physical activity, chest pain associated with nausea or vomiting, chest pain accompanied by diaphoresis or sweating, or chest pain described as "pressure," has a higher likelihood of being related to acute coronary syndrome, or inadequate supply of blood to the heart muscle, but even without these symptoms chest pain may be a sign of acute coronary syndrome. Other clues in the history can help lower the suspicion for myocardial infarction. These include chest pain described as "sharp" or "stabbing", chest pain that is positional or pleuritic in nature, and chest pain that can be reproduced with palpation. However, both atypical and typical symptoms of acute coronary syndrome can occur, and in general a history cannot be enough to rule out the diagnosis of acute coronary syndrome. In some cases, chest pain may not even be a symptom of an acute cardiac event. An estimated 33% of persons with myocardial infarction in the United States do not present with chest pain, and carry a significantly higher mortality as a result of delayed treatment.

Physical examination
Careful medical history and physical examination is essential in separating dangerous from trivial causes of disease, and the management of chest pain may be done on specialized units (termed medical assessment units) to concentrate the investigations. Occasionally, invisible medical signs will direct the diagnosis towards particular causes, such as Levine's sign in cardiac ischemia. However, in the case of acute coronary syndrome, a third heart sound, diaphoresis, and hypotension are the most strongly associated physical exam findings. However these signs are limited in their prognostic and diagnostic value. Other physical exam findings suggestive of cardiac chest pain may include hypertension, tachycardia, bradycardia, and new heart murmurs. Chest pain that is reproducible during the physical exam with contact of the chest wall is more indicative of non-cardiac chest pain, but still cannot completely rule out acute coronary syndrome. For this reason, in general, additional tests are required to establish the diagnosis.

In the emergency department the typical approach to chest pain involves ruling out the most dangerous causes: heart attack, pulmonary embolism, thoracic aortic dissection, esophageal rupture, tension pneumothorax, and cardiac tamponade.  By elimination or confirmation of the most serious causes, a diagnosis of the origin of the pain may be made. Often, no definite cause will be found and reassurance is then provided.

Risk scores 
The Global Registry of Acute Coronary Events score and the Thrombosis in Myocardial Infarction performed at time of admission may help stratify persons into low, intermediate and high risk groups for acute coronary syndrome. However these scores do not provide management guidelines for risk-stratified persons.

The HEART score, stratifies persons into low-risk and high-risk groups, and recommends either discharge or admission based upon the score.

Cumulative score:
 0-3: 2.5% risk of adverse cardiac event. Patient's can be discharged with follow-up.
 4-6: 20.3% risk of adverse cardiac event. Patients should be admitted to the hospital for trending of troponin and provocative testing.
 ≥7: 72.7% risk of adverse cardiac event, suggesting early invasive measures with these patients and close coordination with inpatient cardiology.
If acute coronary syndrome ("heart attack") is suspected, many people are admitted briefly for observation, sequential ECGs, and measurement of cardiac enzymes in the blood over time. On occasion, further tests on follow up may determine the cause.

Medical tests

On the basis of the above, a number of tests may be ordered:
 An electrocardiogram (ECG)
 Chest radiograph or chest x rays are frequently performed
 Echocardiography can be useful in patients with known cardiac disease or aortic dissection
 CT scanning is used in the diagnosis of aortic dissection
 V/Q scintigraphy or CT pulmonary angiogram (when a pulmonary embolism is suspected)
 Blood tests:
 Troponin I or T (to indicate myocardial damage)
 Complete blood count
 Electrolytes and renal function (creatinine)
 Liver enzymes
 Creatine kinase (and CK-MB fraction in many hospitals)
 D-dimer (when suspicion for pulmonary embolism is present but low)
 serum lipase to exclude acute pancreatitis

Management
Management of chest pain varies with the underlying cause of the pain and the stage of care.

Prehospital care 
Chest pain is a common symptom encountered by emergency medical services. Aspirin increases survival in people with acute coronary syndrome and it is reasonable for EMS dispatchers to recommend it in people with no recent serious bleeding. Supplemental oxygen was used in the past for most people with chest pain but is not needed unless the oxygen saturations are less than 94% or there are signs of respiratory distress. Entonox is frequently used by EMS personnel in the prehospital environment. However, there is little evidence about its effectiveness.

Hospital care 
Hospital care of chest pain begins with initial survey of a person's vital signs, airway and breathing, and level of consciousness. This may also include attachment of ECG leads, cardiac monitors, intravenous lines and other medical devices depending on initial evaluation. After evaluation of a person's history, risk factors, physical examination, laboratory testing and imaging, management begins depending on suspected diagnoses. Depending upon the diagnosis, a person may be placed in the intensive care unit, admitted to the hospital, or be treated outpatient. For persons with suspected cardiac chest pain or acute coronary syndrome, or other emergent diagnoses such as pneumothorax, pulmonary embolism, or aortic dissection, admission to the hospital is most often recommended for further treatment.

Outpatient care 
For people with non-cardiac chest pain, cognitive behavioral therapy might be helpful on an outpatient basis. A 2015 Cochrane review found that cognitive behavioral therapy might reduce the frequency of chest pain episodes the first three months after treatment. For persons with chest pain due to gastroesophageal reflux disease, a proton-pump inhibitor has been shown to be the most effective treatment. However, treatment with proton pump inhibitors has been shown to be no better than placebo in persons with noncardiac chest pain not caused by gastroesophageal reflux disease. For musculoskeletal causes of chest pain, manipulation therapy or chiropractic therapy, acupuncture,  or a recommendation for increased exercise are often used as treatment. Studies have shown conflicting results on the efficacy of these treatments. A combination therapy of nonsteroidal anti-inflammatory drugs and manipulation therapy with at-home exercises has been shown to be most effective in treatment of musculoskeletal chest pain.

Epidemiology 

Chest pain is a common presenting problem.  Overall chest pain is responsible for an estimated 6% of all emergency department visits in the United States and is the most common reason for hospital admission. Chest pain is also very common in primary care clinics, representing 1-3% of all visits. The rate of emergency department visits in the US for chest pain decreased 10% from 1999 to 2008. but a subsequent increase of 13% was seen from 2006 to 2011. Less than 20% of all cases of chest pain admissions are found to be due to coronary artery disease. The rate of chest pain as a symptom of acute coronary syndrome varies among populations based upon age, sex, and previous medical conditions. In general, women are more likely than men to present without chest pain (49% vs. 38%) in cases of myocardial infarction.

References

External links 

Pain
Torso
Wikipedia medicine articles ready to translate